Arthur Mendel (June 6, 1905 –  October 14, 1979) was an American musicologist, known as a Bach scholar. He was born in Boston and died in Newark, New Jersey.

Education
He graduated from Harvard University in 1925 before going to study with Nadia Boulanger in Paris.

Career
Mendel was an editor at G. Schirmer, Inc. (1930-1938), the journal of the American Musicological Society (1940-1943) and Associated Music Publishers (1941-1943).

For 31 years, Mendel taught at Princeton University.

Literary works 
 music critics on the "Nation" (1930–1933)
 editor of "The Bach Reader", 1945 (with H. T. David)
 Studies in the History of Musical Pitch, 1968
 With Nathan Broder, translator of Mozart: His Character, His Work by Alfred Einstein
 Translator of 'Mozart's Choice of Keys' by Alfred Einstein

References

American music critics
American male conductors (music)
1905 births
1979 deaths
20th-century American conductors (music)
20th-century American non-fiction writers
20th-century American musicologists
20th-century American male musicians
Harvard University alumni